CS Universitatea Cluj-Napoca is a Romanian professional basketball club based in Cluj-Napoca, Romania. The club, for sponsorship reason under the name U-Banca Transilvania Cluj-Napoca, competes in the Liga Națională. As other sports teams that were initially part of the parent sports club, U Cluj, for historical reasons, the club keeps the name U (short form of Universitatea) in its name.

History
Whilst the parent sports club, U Cluj was founded in 1919, the basketball team was founded in 1947 and played for the first time in the Romanian Championship in 1966. Since then, U Cluj was a constant presence in the Romanian First Division, with their best performances being recorded in the 1990s, when they won three Romanian Championships.

During its history, the team had different names. Since 1990, the main sponsor is usually added to the name of the parent sports club, U Cluj. This resulted in a change of name every time the main sponsor was changed. Previous names of the team were U Ştiinţa, Ştiinţa IMF, U Metalul Rosu, U Fimaro, U SM Invest, U Sanex, and U Carbochim.

In the 2012–2013 season, U Mobitelco Cluj Napoca finished on 7th place (20 wins – 10 losses) and qualify for the play-off. Here the team played the first round against CSM Oradea but lost with 3–1. Also the team played the Romanian Cup final but lost against CS Gaz Metan Medias with the score 62–76. At the end of that season the coach and all the foreign players left the team.

The most famous player who played for U Cluj was Gheorghe Mureșan, who signed in 1993 with the Washington Bullets, becoming the tallest player ever in the NBA. He played 6 successful seasons with the Bullets and the New Jersey Nets, averaging a career 9.8 points, 6.4 rebounds and 0.5 assists. Mureșan obtained the title of NBA Most Improved Player following the 1995–96 NBA season. He began his career playing two years for Universitatea Cluj-Napoca.

Arena

U-BT Cluj plays its home games in the main Sports hall from Cluj-Napoca, BT Arena, which accommodates 10,000 spectators or in Horia Demian Sports Hall, with a capacity of 2,525 spectators.

Fans and rivalries

U-BT Cluj has the largest fan base in Romania. It was the first team in Romania to have 10,000 people in the stands at a basketball match (Basketball Champions League quarter finals, April 2022).The main rivalries of "U" are the ones with CSU Sibiu("The derby of Transylvania") ,CSM Oradea and CSA Steaua Bucharest.

Sponsorship names
Due to sponsorship reasons, the team has been known as:

Logos

Honours
Liga Națională
Winners (7): 1992, 1993, 1996, 2011, 2017, 2021, 2022
Runners-up (7): 1959, 1962, 1991, 1994, 2006, 2008, 2010
Third place (13): 1960, 1963, 1966, 1967, 1970, 1973, 1976, 1977, 1978, 1995, 1999, 2007, 2019

Romanian Cup
Winners (5): 1995, 2016, 2017, 2018, 2020
Runners-up (1): 2006

Romanian Supercup
Winners (3): 2016, 2017, 2021

FIBA EuroCup Challenge
Quarter Finals: 2007

Central European Basketball League (CEBL)
Runners-up: 2010

FIBA Europe Cup
Quarter Finals: 2019–2020

Basketball Champions League
Quarter Finals: 2021-2022

Current roster

Depth chart

Notable players
- Set a club record or won an individual award as a professional player.
- Played at least one official international match for his senior national team at any time.

Head coaches

References

External links
  Official website 
  U Mobitelco BT Cluj-Napoca Team Profile at Baschetromania.ro  
 Eurobasket.com Cluj Napoca Page

Sport in Cluj County
Sport in Cluj-Napoca
Basketball teams in Romania
Basketball teams established in 1947
1947 establishments in Romania